Pittsfield Cemetery is a historic cemetery at 203 Wahconah Street in Pittsfield, Massachusetts.  Established in 1850, it is good example of a rural cemetery, and is the resting ground of many prominent Pittsfield residents, with a number of architecturally significant elements.  It also houses a number of Pittsfield's earliest burials, which were relocated here from a cemetery near the city center.  The cemetery was listed on the National Register of Historic Places in 2007.

Description
This land includes a largely undeveloped tract between Onota Street and Valentine Road. Laid out in the fashionable rural cemetery style, the cemetery features winding lanes for circulation, and plantings of specimen trees.

The easternmost area of the cemetery, between Onota Brook and Wahconah Street, is an entry area with no burial sites.  It includes the entrance arch, a two-story superintendent's house, and the Calvin Memorial Chapel.  A structure originally built as a receiving tomb has been converted into a crematorium.

History
The cemetery was initially laid out in 1850, prompted by the city's growing population, and the fact that its principal burying ground at North and East Streets was full.  Although the cemetery started without much fanfare or styling in 1850, over the next 100 years it acquired a number of interesting elements. Funds for the Allen Memorial Arch and Main Gate were donated in 1885 by Thomas Allen, Jr., and provide an imposing entry to the facility.  A memorial to Allen elsewhere in the cemetery is believed to be the largest piece of red granite in the world.  In 1900 the chapel was dedicated.  In the 1930s cemetery officials added the Superintendent's Cottage and a Maintenance Garage.  As the cemetery grew in the 1910s, the noted Olmsted Brothers landscape firm was retained to plan the layout of new sections of the cemetery.

See also
National Register of Historic Places listings in Berkshire County, Massachusetts

References

Cemeteries on the National Register of Historic Places in Massachusetts
Buildings and structures in Pittsfield, Massachusetts
Cemeteries in Berkshire County, Massachusetts
National Register of Historic Places in Berkshire County, Massachusetts
Cemeteries established in the 1850s
1850 establishments in Massachusetts